The 2nd constituency of Jász-Nagykun-Szolnok County is one of the single member constituencies of the National Assembly, the national legislature of Hungary. The constituency standard abbreviation: Jász-Nagykun-Szolnok 02. OEVK.

Since 2014, it has been represented by János Pócs of the Fidesz–KDNP party alliance.

Geography
The 2nd constituency is located in north-western part of Jász-Nagykun-Szolnok County.

The constituency borders with 3rd constituency of Heves County to the north and northeast, 3rd constituency to the east, 1st constituency and 12th constituency of Pest County to the south and 9th constituency of Pest County to the west.

List of municipalities
The constituency includes the following municipalities:

History
The 2nd constituency of Jász-Nagykun-Szolnok County was created in 2011 and contained parts of the pre-2011 abolished constituencies of 1st and 2nd of this County. Its borders have not changed since its creation.

Members
The constituency was first represented by János Pócs of the Fidesz from 2014, and he was re-elected in 2018 and 2022.

Election result

2022 election

2018 election

2014 election

References

Jasz-Nagykun-Szolnok 2nd